This is a list of characters that appear in the Wedding Peach franchise.

Angels

Love Angels 
 / 

 The main protagonist of the series, Momoko is petite. With Limone and Aphrodite coming to her aid, she is then given the power to transform into Wedding Peach, the legendary Love Angel. As Wedding Peach, she is tasked with fighting devils intent on destroying the Love Wave. As simply Momoko, she is a freshman of Hanazono Junior High, a photographer of the Newspaper Club, and like many other girls at school, has a massive crush on Kazuya Yanagiba, captain of the soccer team, but eventually develops feelings fellow freshman Yousuke Fuuma. 
 She uses the Saint Miroir to transform into Wedding Peach and uses it to purify devils. She can also summon the Saint Crystal from her ruby ring to absorb the devils' attacks and turn it into a love wave. She holds the ruby ring known as the "Something Old" from her mother, which is one of the four parts of the Saint Something Four from the Angel World and responsible the inheritance of love. Her Japanese name Momoko means "Peach". Her theme colors are red and pink.

 / 

 One of Momoko's best friends, Yuri is known for being a high-class girl, speaking politely at all times, and is generally the most well-mannered in their group. Like Momoko, Yuri can transform into a Love Angel (Lily), reborn on Earth as a human. In the manga, Yuri is stated to be 1/4 French. 
 She use the Saint Lip Liner to transform into Angel Lily and makes a rainbow-like ribbon to tangle up opponents. Once she obtains the Something Blue, She can also summon a rod from her blue earrings to create a star attack. Her Japanese name Yuri means "Lily". Her theme colors are blue and cyan.

 / 

 Another of Momoko's best friends, Hinagiku is a short-haired, rough-speaking tomboy who practices judo. Her family consists of her mother, father and younger brother, and they all live atop their flower shop. Like Momoko and Yuri, Hinagiku is a Love Angel (Daisy), reborn on Earth as a human.
 She use the Saint Pendule to transform into Angel Daisy and creates a blizzard to disorientate enemies and freeze upcoming obstacles. Once she obtains the Something Borrowed, She can also summon a rod to create a wind attack. Her Japanese name Hinagiku means "daisy". Her theme colors are yellow and green.

/

 The fourth Love Angel to appear in the series. She assumes the name of Scarlet O'Hara while in the human world. When she's transformed, she mostly uses the Saint Pure Sword to cut her enemies, while she has also been shown to shoot fire and energy from the weapon as well. She holds the tiara known as the "Something New".

 Scarlet's history varies between the anime and the original manga. In the anime, her approach to defeating the devils is radically different from the other angels. Her main objective is to eradicate the devils after one of her close friends, Freesia, is killed off by one of them. The other angels eventually get her to stop her old ways, and are able to team up with the bond they have towards the end of the series and into the OVA. In the manga, She is a reincarnated angel like Yuri and Hinagiku, and is a half-Japanese returnee student from America who gained the memories of being an angel as a young girl, the first Love Angel to do so. She moves to Japan in order to be closer to the other Love Angels. She holds a grudge against devils because they killed Celeste, the angel she, Lily and Daisy were tasked to protect. While she tries to be a friend to her fellow Angels, she still feels the need to warn Momoko away from Yousuke. Eventually, she comes to accept their love, and at the end of the series, looks forward to finding a romance of her own. In the manga epilogue, she marries her childhood friend from America, Dean Butler. Her name is a reference to Scarlett O'Hara from the novel Gone With The Wind. Her theme colors are purple and red.

Other Angels 
 / 

 Yanagiba Kazuya is the captain of Hanazono Junior High's captain team, known throughout the school for his good looks, smarts and athleticism, thus capturing the hearts of many female students. Momoko, Yuri and Hinagiku would often resort to crazy means to garner his attention, but he remains blissfully oblivious to almost all of their attempts. For the most part of the series, Yanagiba plays the part of the kind senpai who seems to be way out of the Angels' league, until his true identity is revealed later on.

 Limone (which means lemon in Italian) is a powerful Senior Angel sent by Aphrodite to watch over Momoko and the others, granting them assistance whenever he is able. To remain close to them, he takes the form of Yanagiba Kazuya, although in this form, he has no memory of the Love Angels or that he is one himself until later in the season. This is so he could evade the devils' detection. In the manga, he was always aware of the Love Angels' existence and took a different identity only to remain close to them.

 A hundred years ago in the Angel World, he and Lily fell in love amid the war between Angels and Devils. Their romance was brief, but it was strong enough to continue into their present lives. In the anime, upon remembering their past relationship, Yanagiba and Yuri (with Momoko and Hinagiku's blessing) continued where they left off, but this again was cut short when Limone sacrificed his life to protect the Human World from a massive attack by a strong devil named Petora. Aphrodite was able to bring him back, but the shock has caused him to lose his memories as Limone and of Yuri, much to the latter's grief.

 Near the end of the series, he is able to revert to being Limone, and together with the Angels and Viento, confronted Raindevila for a final battle. In the aftermath, he expressed a desire to enjoy his life as simply Kazuya Yanagiba, which Aphrodite gladly granted. In the manga, he and Yuri marry ten years later.

 Goddess of love and beauty and ruler of the angel world. She is unable to leave the angel world and must rely on Limone and the Love Angels to ward off the devils. She is the sister of Angel Celeste, Momoko's mother, and considered Momoko's aunt respectively. In Wedding Peach DX, it is revealed after defeating Raindevila that Aphrodite erased the Love Angels, Limone’s, Yousuke’s, and Takuro’s memories of anything to do with angels and devils in order for them to live normal lives again. She then makes the Love Angel's memories known again due to the revolting devils, with the exception of Limone.

 / 

 Celeste is the sister and guardian of Aphrodite. While fighting against devils with Angels Lily, Daisy and Salvia, she was knocked down to earth, losing her memory. She begins to use the name Sakura. On Earth she falls in love with Hanasaki Shouichirou, a young photographer. They have a child together, named Momoko. Three years later, Limone finds Celeste and restores her memory. Celeste says goodbye to her family and leaves. She vanishes, leaving behind her ring, which is part of the Saint Something Four, the Something Old. She then returns to the angel world to protect it and falls into a deep sleep.

 Celeste returns after waking from the energies of the Saint Something Four to tell Momoko of her past. She is given permission by Aphrodite to spend one day on Earth. However, she uses up more energy saving Momoko from a brainwashed Viento, and again falls to sleep. In the final episode after defeating Raindevila, she awakes and returns to a normal family life in the OVA. In Wedding Peach DX, Celeste is aware of Momoko’s former identity as a Love Angel. In episode 4 of the OVA, Celeste helps Momoko and the others get back into their bodies after being switched by the devil Dr. Belphegor.

 In the manga, her past differs: she is killed along with Lily, Daisy and Salvia and reincarnated 100 years later. She falls in love with Momoko's father, but remembers her past and returns to the angel world. The barrier she erected, however, prevents her from meeting or contacting her daughter. Momoko initially has doubts about her mother as she traces Celeste's legacy, but her mother finally gets through and sends a brief message that she has faith in her and will be able to meet her if the threat of the devils is removed and the barrier is dissolved. Eventually after the defeat of Raindevila, Momoko and her mother have a tearful reunion.

Devils 
 / 

 The leader of the devil world (her name is French for "Queen Devil"). Her greatest desire is to destroy all love and subjugate the angel world. In the anime, it is revealed that years ago she ventured into the Angel World and fell in love with an angel at first sight, who later became another angel's husband. With that event, they both unknowingly banished Raindevila from the Angel World. Ever since, Raindevila has wanted to kill all those who love. Her backstory and subplot do not exist in the manga; she is simply depicted as a tyrannical ruler. In the anime, she is purified and lives as a normal devil, while in the manga, she is purified and put in a long sleep. It is hoped on waking that she will protect the Devil World the way Aphrodite protects the Angel World.

 Pluie is the first of Raindevila's primary followers to appear in the story. He enacts various schemes to both destroy love and lure out the Love Angels, but eventually is sucked into the vortex of destruction as punishment for countless defeats by Raindevila (in the anime). He is destroyed by the angels in the manga. In the anime, before his demise, he appears to have hints of feelings for Aquelda, protecting her before she was killed, and reaching out to save her when she was caught in the Angel's love wave.

 A cute and small devil that served as Pluie's sidekick until he was purified by Wedding Peach, and subsequently forced out of the devil realm. Jama-P is often humorously picked on by the Angels (mostly Hinagiku), but sticks around as their closest ally. He becomes a resident to Momoko's house, and pretends to be a stuffed toy when others are around.

 Aquelda is the second of Raindevila’s primary followers, only appearing in the anime. Her main goal was to follow Raindevila’s commands while also making money in the human world, most of the time cheating people out of their money. In episode 14 of the anime, Pluie saves her from being discarded from Raindevila and is allowed to live. She steals Momoko’s ring and brings it to Pluie, finding it to be a part of the Saint Something Four. She joins Pluie in one last battle, but is purified by Wedding Peach. It’s implied that she had feelings for Pluie before she was defeated.

 Sandra is the third of Raindevila’s primary followers, only appearing in the anime. He sends out the three devils Noise, Blitz, and Cloud to find the Saint Something Four. As the episodes progress, one by one they are purified, including Sandra’s side devil Donna. In episode 22, Sandra locates and kidnaps Jama-P to lure out the love angels, which ultimately backfires and is purified by Wedding Peach.

 Igneous is the fourth of Raindevila's primary followers (second in the manga) to appear in the story. He is a fire demon from the tribe of Hima. He is a sneaky and manipulative demon who doesn't like to get his hands dirty and usually has his minions fight for him before he goes in for the kill. He makes a pact with Takuro and takes residence in his heart and controls his body. He starts to like peace and quiet and actually sees Takuro as a friend, though he doesn't admit saying he is a member of the fire demon tribe. He is later killed by Potamos. Before he dies, he goes to Takuro and releases him from his contract. He then tells Takuro that he actually started to become fond of him. As he passes he looks at the moon and admits that it is beautiful.

 / 

 The fifth of Raindevila's primary followers (third in the manga) to appear in the story. She comes to help Igneous and has a crush on him, but later in the series kills him for turning soft by the love angels and falling for Yousuke. Potamos is later turned good by Wedding Peach and becomes an ordinary school girl. She becomes a love angel in the second special. Her theme colors are green and yellow in the second special.
 In the manga, Potamos tries to take revenge for Igneous but falls in love with Yousuke/Viento because of his devil energy, even calling him "V-kun". She eventually returns him to his father, but when Yousuke rebels against his father and Uragano attacks, Potamos shields Viento and Peach with her body and sacrifices her life to save him, leading Peach to realize she had truly loved him.

 / 

 Petora was the sixth of Raindevila's primary followers, only appearing in the anime. He was originally a very brutal devil to the point Queen Raindevila sealed him away in stone. His seal is lifted and is ordered by Raindevila to defeat the love angels and to find the Saint Something Four. His power starts off very weak and relies on sucking the love wave from people to harness more power. He becomes the new principal at Saint Hanazano campus in search of the love angels.
 In episode 42 of the anime, he gets back his complete devil power, and goes to attack Momoko and Yousuke after seeing them together. Raindevila assists him by summoning the vortex of destruction. He tries to throw Limone into the vortex, but is taken in with him, bringing his demise.

 Kachusha was the seventh of Raindevila's primary followers, only appearing in the anime. Her main mission was to awaken Viento by injecting negative energy into Yousuke. She gets purified by Wedding Peach in episode 46.

Supporting characters

 Shoichirou is the husband of Sakura and the father of Momoko. He is a professional photographer. He met Sakura after she fell down to Earth and lost her memory. They fell in love and get married. They later have Momoko. Once Sakura regains her memory as Celeste, she leaves to go back to the Angel World, but not before telling Shoichirou to take care of Momoko for her. He has no knowledge about the angels and devils and doesn't know that his wife and daughter are also love angels.

 / 

 The freshman goalie on the school soccer team. He enjoys teasing Momoko, calling her "Momopi" and making fun of her small stature and round face, but eventually begins to have feelings for her. Because they are both vehemently in denial of their feelings to each other, it takes quite a while for them to get together. When they finally did, however, their happiness is short-lived as it is soon revealed that Yousuke has inherited his late father's devilish blood.: Viento, as he is came to be known in the Devil World, is the heir to the Rafaal Tribe, and holds the power to destroy the Love Angels and what is left of the Angel World. Raindevila aims to capture him for this very reason, but with Wedding Peach's help, he is able to break free from the evil within him, and through the love they share, they are able to purify the world of all devils, even Raindevila herself. As requested by Wedding Peach, Yousuke's devilish powers get sealed by Aphrodite, and he restarts his relationship with Momoko as a normal human. In the manga, they marry ten years later along with their friends.

 The smartest student at school, constantly placing the top spot on all class rankings, and is also Hinagiku's childhood friend. Desiring to be stronger and more confident, Takuro makes a pact with the demon, Igneous, who takes residence in his heart and controls his body at times. At first he saw it as a burden, but starts to see Igneous as a friend. When Igneous comes to him before he dies and breaks their pact, Takuro tries everything he can to save him, even going to the Love Angels for help. In the anime, he had a crush on Momoko, while in the manga, his constant stalking of Momoko led many to believe he liked her but in fact wanted to impress Hinagiku. In the manga, he later marries Hinagiku.

 He is a childhood friend of Scarlet back in America. In the manga, he eventually marries Scarlet. He only appears in the manga. His name is a reference to Rhett Butler from the novel, Gone with the Wind.

References 

Wedding Peach
Superhero teams